Jurgen Degabriele (born 10 October 1996) is a Maltese professional footballer who plays for Hibernians in the Maltese Premier League.

Club career 

Jurgen Degabriele grew through the Hibernians youth system. At age 14, he had a trial with Triestina.

He attracted interest from Calcio Padova, being involved in a friendly during a trial. However, he refused to join them, claiming to have been ignored and mistreated throughout his trial. In 2016, he signed a five-year contract with the Hibernians senior side.

Degabriele established himself as an up-and-coming important player for Hibernians, playing a part in the club's winning of the 2016–17 Premier League. 

On 18 May 2018, Degabriele bagged four goals and condemned Lija Athletic to relegation.

International career 

Degabriele was part of the Malta youth squads, namely the under-17, under-19 and under-21.

Upon being promoted as national team manager, Ray Farrugia called up Degabriele to the senior squad, amongst other players, for a training camp in Austria. Degabriele's first match with the Malta national football team was against Armenia in a 1–1 draw.

Career statistics
Statistics accurate as of match played 21 November 2022.

International goals
Scores and results list Malta's goal tally first.

Honours

Club 

Hibernians
 Maltese Premier League: 2014–15, 2016–17

Individual 
 Best Youth League Player: 2015–16
 Best Young Player: 2017
 Best Young Forward: 2017

References

External links 
 
 

1996 births
Living people
Maltese footballers
People from Pietà, Malta
Malta international footballers
Hibernians F.C. players
Maltese Premier League players
Malta under-21 international footballers
Malta youth international footballers
Association football forwards